Sifo may refer to:

Kantar Sifo, a Swedish company operating in the field of opinion and social research.
Liu Shifu (劉師復), Chinese anarchist who wrote in Esperanto under the pseudonym Sifo.
Sifo Company, a former American toy manufacturer.